Robertsville State Park is a public recreation area bordering the Meramec River in unincorporated Robertsville in Franklin County, Missouri. The state park's  include a boat launch, campground, playground, picnic shelters, and the Spice Bush and Lost Hill hiking trails. The land was once owned by Edward James Roberts, who moved to the area at age 14 in 1831.

References

External links

Robertsville State Park Missouri Department of Natural Resources 
Robertsville State Park Map Missouri Department of Natural Resources

State parks of Missouri
Protected areas of Franklin County, Missouri
Protected areas established in 1979
1976 establishments in Missouri
Buildings and structures in Franklin County, Missouri